Clearwater State Forest is a state forest located in Montana. The forest has an area of approximately 18,076 acres and is one of the seven state forests in Montana.

The forest was designated as a state forest in 1925 through a law passed by the Montana Legislature.

See also
 List of forests in Montana

References

External links
 U.S. Geological Survey Map at the U.S. Geological Survey Map Website. Retrieved December 12th, 2022.

Montana state forests